Kanan Malhotra is an Indian model and television actor.

Television career
In 2010, he made his television debut in the show Chand Chupa Badal Mein on Star Plus where he played the cameo role of Aditya Sharma. He then appeared in the Zee TV show Apno Ke Liye Geeta Ka Dharmayudh as Prateek Bhagat. In 2011, he starred as Dhruv Ahluwalia in the Imagine TV television show Sawaare Sabke Sapne... Preeto.

In 2012, Malhotra rose to fame with his portrayal of Daljeet Singh in the romantic series Rab Se Sohna Isshq on Zee TV. He later bagged the episodic role of Siddharth Kapoor in the episodic drama  Pyaar Tune Kya Kiya on  Zing. He then went on to appear in several mythological drama series, including Suryaputra Karn on Sony Entertainment Television and Mahakali — Anth Hi Aarambh Hai & Karmaphal Daata Shani on Colors TV.

In 2018, he appeared in Colors TV's horror episodic drama Kaun Hai? as Rudrapratap Singh. In the same year, he went on to appear in Colors TV's supernatural series  Tantra as Nirvan Khanna.
In 2019, he appeared as Vivek Oberoi in show called Navrangi Re! and in the same year he played the role of  Bharata in show Ram Siya Ke Luv Kush till the show went off-air in 2020.
In 2020, he played the role of Bhagwan Vishnu in Devi Adi Parashakti and of Yudhishthir in Star Bharat's serial RadhaKrishn. From July 2022, he is playing the role of Gunojirao in Punyashlok Ahilyabai.

Personal life
Malhotra met television actress Chahat Khanna in 2010 and they dated for 2 years but the couple had a falling out. after which he began dating his Rab Se Sohna Isshq co-star Ekta Kaul but the couple split up in 2013.

Television

References

Living people
People from New Delhi
Indian male television actors
Indian male soap opera actors
1987 births
21st-century Indian male actors